The South Africa Amateurs are the amateur national rugby union team of South Africa. They played in the Africa Cup until 2007.

South Africa national rugby union team